Greatest Hits is the second compilation album by American country pop artist Billy Joe Royal. It was released on February 12, 1991 via Atlantic Records. The album peaked at number 32 on the Billboard Top Country Albums chart.

Track listing

Chart performance

References

1991 greatest hits albums
Billy Joe Royal albums
Atlantic Records compilation albums